Venerable Theoctistus of Palestine (also Theoktistos; died 451) was an associate of Euthymius the Great. He was an ascetic who lived in a nearby cell at the Pharan lavra.

Ascetic life
About five years after Euthymius arrived, they went into the desert for Great Lent, and found in a wadi a large cave where they remained praying in solitude for some time. Eventually shepherds from Bethany discovered them, and people from the area began to visit seeking spiritual guidance and bringing food. The monks then built a church. When other monks came seeking instruction, Euthymius and Theoctistus built a lavra over the cave church. Theoctistus became hegumen of the monastery.

Euthymius is credited with establishing several monasteries, including that of Theoctistus.

Death and commemoration
Theoctistus died at an advanced age in 451 and is commemorated on 3 September.

References

Further reading
 (pp. 306−307)

Year of birth missing
451 deaths
Hegumens
Ascetics